The 1902 Nevada gubernatorial election was held on November 4, 1902. The Silver Party nominee "Honest" John Sparks defeated Republican nominee Abner Coburn Cleveland, with 6,540 votes to his opponents 4,778. He succeeded fellow Silver Party Governor Reinhold Sadler in office.

General election

Unlike in 1898, when Silver Party Governor Reinhold Sadler faced off against Republican, Democratic, and Populist candidates, the state Democratic Party, the Populists, and the state Silver Party had essentially merged into one electoral vehicle (reflected in William Jennings Bryan's landslide victory in the state two years prior in the 1896 Presidential election, only four years after a Populist landslide). Cattleman John Sparks won and become the third of four Silver Party governor in a row.

Republican nominee A. C. Cleveland would die the following year, in 1903, and Sparks himself would die a year before his second term ended, in 1908.

Candidates

John Sparks (Silver-Democratic), Rancher, businessman. 
Abner Coburn Cleveland (Republican), Cattleman, former member of the state Assembly and Senate, nominee for Governor of Nevada in 1894.

Results

References

1902
Nevada
Gubernatorial